Roketsan Roket Sanayii ve Ticaret A.S. is a major Turkish weapons manufacturer and defense contractor based in Ankara, Turkey. Incorporated in 1988 by Turkey's Defense Industry Executive Committee (SSİK) to establish the nation's industrial base on missile technology, the company has quickly risen to become one of Turkey's top 500 industrial corporations.

Roketsan's current share holders include Turkish Armed Forces Foundation (55.5%), ASELSAN (15%), MKEK (15%), Vakıflar Bankası (10%),  HAVELSAN (4.5%). Roketsan is best known for its wide range of guided and unguided rockets as well as guided missiles such as Bora, Atmaca, Cirit, UMTAS and OMTAS. The company also produces subsystems for Stinger, Rapier and ESSM missiles and provides technology and engineering solutions for other integrated civilian and military platforms. Recent developments highlight small-diameter precision-strike bombs for unmanned aerial vehicles.

Roketsan is the only Turkish company to have obtained CMMI/ DEV 3 (Capability Maturity Model Integration – for Development) approval for all its design and development processes.

It was ranked 96th in 2018 and 89th in 2019 in Defense News' most valuable defense industry companies list. In 2020, it was ranked 91st.

The company is one of the organizers of the Teknofest Aerospace and Technology Festival.

History
Roketsan signed a contract in 2013 to build the project of the national UFS Space Launch System. In 2013, the Government of Turkey approved the construction of its first satellite launching center by Roketsan. In August 2020, the Roketsan Satellite Launch, Space Systems and Advanced Technologies Research Center was established.

On 29 June 2021, the governments of Turkey and Bangladesh signed a defence memorandum of understanding for the export of Roketsan products to Bangladesh, according to İsmail Demir, president of Presidency of Defense Industries. Roketsan had already delivered the TRG-300 Tiger MLRS to the Bangladesh Army in June 2021 in a separate deal. Bangladesh was set to become one of the top defence equipment clients of Turkey and Roketsan in the following few years. In October 2021, the Bangladesh Army received a second batch of the TRG-300 Tiger missile system.

Products

Facilities 

 Munition Disposal Facility (MAAT)
 Air Bag Project “Booster Bag” used in airbag systems by ARC Automotive Company /U.S.A.produced by ROKETSAN.
 Ammunition Surveillance Facility (MIGYEM)
 Space Systems and Advanced Technologies Research Center

References

External links 
 ROKETSAN official website
 ROKETSAN Products & Services
 Turkish Undersecretariat for Defence Industries (SSM)

Defence companies of Turkey
Companies established in 1988
Turkish companies established in 1988
Space program of Turkey
Guided missile manufacturers
 
Government-owned companies of Turkey
1988 establishments in Turkey